Asianet may refer to:

Disney Star channels
Asianet Communications, an Indian media company wholly owned by Disney Star
Asianet (TV channel), a Malayalam language general entertainment channel
Asianet Plus, a Malayalam language general entertainment channel
Asianet Movies, a Malayalam language movies channel

Asianet News Network (ANN) channels 

Asianet News Network, an Indian news media company wholly owned by Jupiter Capital
Asianet News (formerly Asianet Global), a Malayalam language news channel
Asianet Suvarna News (formerly Asianet Suvarna), a Kannada news channel

Asianet satellite communications
Asianet Satellite Communications Limited, business name Asianet Digital TV, Indian cable and media company
Asianet Mobile TV, media platform